Metengliang is a village and the headquarters of an eponymous circle in the Anjaw district in the north-eastern state of Arunachal Pradesh, India.

Metengliang is situated on the bank of the Delei River, a tributary of the Lohit River. The nearest town is Hayuliang which is also the headquarters of the subdivision.

The Metengliang Circle had a population of 1,608 people, distributed in 30 villages, as per the 2011 census.

References 

Villages in Anjaw district